KBOB refers to the following broadcasting stations in the United States:

KBOB (AM), a radio station (1170 AM) licensed to serve Davenport, Iowa, United States
KIIK-FM, a radio station on 104.9 MHz licensed to DeWitt, Iowa, which held the call sign KBOB-FM from 2000 to 2014
KBEA-FM, a radio station on 99.7 MHz licensed to Muscatine, Iowa, which held the call sign KBOB from 1994 to 2000